Cymbiola pulchra excelsior is a subspecies of sea snail, a marine gastropod mollusk in the family Volutidae, the volutes.

Description

Distribution

References

 Bail & Limpus, 1998) Bail & Limpus (1998). Revision of Cymbiola [book]. Evolver, Roma.

Volutidae
Gastropods described in 1998